The Electronic Commerce (EC Directive) Regulations 2002, SI 2002/2013, incorporates the EU Electronic Commerce Directive 2000/31/EC into the law of the United Kingdom. They apply to contracts concluded by electronic means over distance whereby the buyer is a consumer. This subordinate legislation provides for rights of the consumer and provisions for which the seller is obliged to fulfill.

Definition of a consumer
A Consumer is a "natural person who is acting for the purposes other than those of his trade, business or profession." The definition is slightly broader than that for the purposes of the Unfair Contract Terms Act 1977 as the subjective requirement of the person not regarding themselves as acting in the course of a business, therefore one may be a consumer if using a company account or using business details for tax purposes.

Obligations imposed upon the seller
Before the contract is formed, the seller must state in a "clear comprehensible and unambiguous manner" the technical step involved to place an order (contractual offer). Terms and conditions under which the contract is concluded must be made available to the consumer in a means capable of reproduction and storage. This does not apply to email, although the Consumer Protection (Distance Selling) Regulations 2000 may apply.

These rights can be expressly exempted, although these regulations applied to the exemption clause, as did the Unfair Contract Terms Act 1977 and the Unfair Terms in Consumer Contracts Regulations 1999.

Information that must be provided to the consumer.
 Acknowledgement of the order by electronic means without undue delay, and information of how to amend any input errors made.

More information must be given under the Consumer Protection (Distance Selling) Regulations 2000.

Rights of the consumer
Liability of breach of these conditions gives rise to an action for Breach of statutory duty.

A court order may be given for access to terms and conditions of which the consumer has already consented.

Where the consumer has not been informed in the correct manner of the procedure to amend errors in orders and they have made errors, the contract can be rescinded.

Contractual construction
reg 12 provides that a contractual offer occurs when the order is sent. Richards construes reg 11(2) as providing that the acknowledgement screen will constitute a contractual acceptance.

Instantaneous Communication here is in line with that discussed by Lord Denning in Entores Ltd v Miles Far East Corporation and so communication is effect when received or when it can reasonably be deemed to have been received.

See also
 Electronic Signature Regulations 2002
 Consumer Protection (Distance Selling) Regulations 2000
 Sale of Goods Act 1979
 Unfair Contract Terms Act 1977
 Electronic Commerce Directive

External links
 OPSI: SI 2002/2013

References

English contract law
2002 in British law
Statutory Instruments of the United Kingdom
E-commerce in the United Kingdom